Ian Andrew Harkes (born March 30, 1995) is an American soccer player who plays for Scottish club Dundee United. He previously played for D.C. United in Major League Soccer. Harkes is a recipient of the MAC Hermann Trophy, which is awarded to the best college soccer player in the United States. He is the son of John Harkes, who captained the U.S. national soccer team during the 1990s.

Early career

High school and academy
Harkes played high school soccer at Gonzaga College High School in Washington, D.C., and for the youth academy of D.C. United. While in D.C. United's academy, he served as the club captain for the U-18 and U-16 academy teams. During his junior and senior years at Gonzaga College High School, Harkes served as the varsity captain. He earned the team's Most Valuable Offensive Player in both 2011 and 2012.

His success with D.C. United's Academy setup and at Gonzaga High earned him several accolades. In 2011, Harkes was named the Gatorade Player of the Year in D.C. In 2012, he was selected as an NSCAA First Team High School All-American, and was selected to play in the High School All-American Game that year. In addition, he was named to the WCAC First Team, was named an All-Met by The Washington Post, and was selected twice to the NSCAA First Team All-South High School Region.

Collegiate
Ahead of the 2013 NCAA Division I men's soccer season, Harkes signed a National Letter of Intent to play for Wake Forest University. On August 30, 2013 he made his Wake Forest debut starting and playing 74 minutes in a 1–0 loss against Coastal Carolina. He earned his first collegiate points a week later, dishing out two assists against Boston College on September 7, 2013. He ended the 2013 campaign with 21 starts, a goal and seven assists. He was the only player on Wake Forest in 2013 to start and play in every match. Harkes was named to the All-ACC Freshman Team at the end of the season.

During his sophomore year, Harkes started and played in 16 matches with the Deacons including playing in all matches in the 2014 ACC Men's Soccer Tournament and 2014 NCAA Division I Men's Soccer Tournament. He finished his sophomore year with seven points off of two goals and three assists. At the end of the 2014 season, he was named to the All-ACC Second Team. Ahead of his junior year at Wake Forest, he was named the team captain for the Deacons. There, he played and started in all 22 matches the Deacons played that season, which involved a run into the round of 16 of the 2015 NCAA Division I Men's Soccer Tournament. Harkes ended the season by being named to the All-ACC First Team, the NSCAA All-South Region Second Team, and the 2015 ACC Men's Soccer Tournament All-Tournament team.

On January 6, 2017, Harkes was awarded the Hermann Trophy, awarded to the best college soccer player in the nation.

Professional career

D.C. United
On January 16, 2017, it was reported that Harkes had signed a homegrown contract with D.C. United of Major League Soccer. Before deciding to sign with United, he wanted to explore options with second-flight clubs in England: he undertook a week long trial at Derby County – one of his fathers former sides – but was not offered a contract by the club. Harkes was then offered another short trial by Fulham which he declined instead choosing to return to the US. The club made the official announcement one week later, on January 23. On March 12, 2017, Harkes made his professional debut, playing a full 90 minutes in a 0–4 loss at New York City FC. He scored his first goal for United on June 13, 2017 in a U.S. Open Cup match against amateur side Christos FC. A few weeks later, he scored his first MLS goal in a 2–4 loss against FC Dallas.

During his second year with United, Harkes lost his starting role to Júnior Moreno and Russell Canouse, making only eight appearances during the 2018 season. He was released by D.C. United at the end of their 2018 season.

Dundee United

Scottish Championship
In January 2019, Harkes signed a two-year contract with Scottish Championship side Dundee United, noting that his Dundee-born grandfather had been a supporter of the club growing up. Four days later, Harkes made his Dundee United debut, coming on in the 70th minute of a 2018–19 Scottish Cup fourth round fixture against Montrose and scoring in the 92nd minute to complete a 4–0 win. On August 30, 2019, he scored Dundee United's fifth goal in a 6–2 win against city rivals Dundee in the Dundee derby. On April 15, 2020, because of the ongoing COVID-19 pandemic, Dundee United were awarded first place in the Scottish Championship, gaining the club and Harkes automatic promotion to the Scottish Premiership. He subsequently extended his contract with the club until 2022.

Scottish Premiership
Harkes made his debut in the Scottish Premiership for Dundee United in the first game of the season, playing 90 minutes against St Johnstone and was named in the Scottish Premiership team of the week for the first week of the season.

International
Harkes has played for the United States men's national under-20 soccer team. On January 8, 2018, he received a call-up for the United States men's national soccer team for a friendly against Bosnia and Herzegovina. He is also eligible internationally for England through being born in Derby and Scotland via his Dundonian grandparentage.

Personal life
Harkes is the son of former U.S. international, John Harkes, who was the coach of United Soccer League club, FC Cincinnati for the 2016 season. He is also the son of Cindi Harkes, who played collegiate soccer for Virginia and professionally in the USL W-League for the Maryland Pride and for Sheffield Wednesday Ladies. He has two younger sisters, Lauren and Lily. In high school, Ian Harkes was a member of the National Honor Society. He is of Scottish descent through his paternal grandparents.

Harkes' wife, Sarah Teegarden, also plays soccer. She signed for Scottish Women's Premier League team Celtic in January 2020.

Career statistics

Club

Honors
Dundee United
 Scottish Championship: 2019–20

References

External links
 Wake Forest Profile

1995 births
Living people
All-American men's college soccer players
American people of Scottish descent
American expatriates in Scotland
American soccer players
Association football midfielders
Citizens of the United States through descent
D.C. United players
Dundee United F.C. players
English emigrants to the United States
English people of American descent
English people of Scottish descent
Expatriate footballers in Scotland
Gonzaga College High School alumni
Hermann Trophy men's winners
Homegrown Players (MLS)
Major League Soccer players
NCAA Division I Men's Soccer Tournament Most Outstanding Player winners
Scottish Professional Football League players
Soccer players from Virginia
Footballers from Derby
Sportspeople from Fairfax, Virginia
United States men's youth international soccer players
Wake Forest Demon Deacons men's soccer players